Rzerzęczyce  is a village in the administrative district of Gmina Kłomnice, within Częstochowa County, Silesian Voivodeship, in southern Poland. From 1975 to 1998 it was in Częstochowa Voivodeship.

The village has a population of 1,796.

References

Villages in Częstochowa County